Below are the squads for the 2011 South Asian Football Federation Cup, hosted by India, which will take place between 1 and 12 December 2011. The player's total caps, their club teams and age are as of 2 December 2011 – the tournament's opening day.

Group A

Afghanistan
Coach:  Mohammad Yousef Kargar

India
Coach:  Savio Medeira

Sri Lanka
Coach:  Jang Jung

Bhutan
Coach:  Hiroaki Matsuyama

Group B

Bangladesh
Coach:  Nikola Ilievski
 
|-----
! colspan="9" bgcolor="#CC0000" align="left" |
|----- bgcolor="#CC0000"

|-----
! colspan="9" bgcolor="#CC0000" align="left" |
|----- bgcolor="#CC0000"
				
				

			
				
|-----
! colspan="9" bgcolor="#CC0000" align="left" |
|----- bgcolor="#CC0000"				

				
				
				

		
				

|-----
! colspan="9" bgcolor="#CC0000" align="left" |
|----- bgcolor="#CC0000"				
				
				
				
	
|-----
! colspan="9" bgcolor="#CC0000" align="left" |
|----- bgcolor="#CC0000"

Maldives
Coach:  István Urbányi

|-----
! colspan="9" bgcolor="#CC0000" align="left" |
|----- bgcolor="#CC0000"

|-----
! colspan="9" bgcolor="#CC0000" align="left" |
|----- bgcolor="#CC0000"
				
				
				
				

|-----
! colspan="9" bgcolor="#CC0000" align="left" |
|----- bgcolor="#CC0000"				
				
				
				
				
				
				

|-----
! colspan="9" bgcolor="#CC0000" align="left" |
|----- bgcolor="#CC0000"				
				
				
				

				
|-----
! colspan="9" bgcolor="#CC0000" align="left" |
|----- bgcolor="#CC0000"

Pakistan
Coach:  Zaviša Milosavljević

|-----
! colspan="9" bgcolor="#B0D3FB" align="left" |
|----- bgcolor="#DFEDFD"

|-----
! colspan="9" bgcolor="#B0D3FB" align="left" |
|----- bgcolor="#DFEDFD"

|-----
! colspan="9" bgcolor="#B0D3FB" align="left" |
|----- bgcolor="#DFEDFD"

|}

Nepal 
Coach:  Graham Roberts

|-----
! colspan="9" bgcolor="#B0D3FB" align="left" |
|----- bgcolor="#DFEDFD"

|-----
! colspan="9" bgcolor="#B0D3FB" align="left" |
|----- bgcolor="#DFEDFD"

|-----
! colspan="9" bgcolor="#B0D3FB" align="left" |
|----- bgcolor="#DFEDFD"

References

squads
SAFF Championship squads